Arthur Groussier (16 August 1863, Orléans - 6 February 1957) was a French politician. At first he joined the Federation of the Socialist Workers of France (FTSF). In 1890 he joined the Revolutionary Socialist Workers' Party (POSR). In 1896 he joined the Revolutionary Communist Alliance (ACR), which in 1902 merged into the Socialist Party of France (PSdF), which in turn merged into the French Section of the Workers' International (SFIO) in 1905. Groussier was a member of the Chamber of Deputies from 1893 to 1902 and from 1906 to 1924. He was a very active Freemason.

References

1863 births
1957 deaths
Politicians from Orléans
Federation of the Socialist Workers of France politicians
Revolutionary Socialist Workers' Party (France) politicians
Socialist Party of France (1902) politicians
French Section of the Workers' International politicians
Members of the 6th Chamber of Deputies of the French Third Republic
Members of the 7th Chamber of Deputies of the French Third Republic
Members of the 9th Chamber of Deputies of the French Third Republic
Members of the 10th Chamber of Deputies of the French Third Republic
Members of the 11th Chamber of Deputies of the French Third Republic
Members of the 12th Chamber of Deputies of the French Third Republic
French Freemasons
Arts et Métiers ParisTech alumni